Elkhead Reservoir is located in northwest Colorado near the town of Craig. It was originally constructed by the Division of Wildlife on the Elkhead Creek, which is a major tributary of the Yampa River. A  river basin drains into the reservoir. The dam was enlarged for two years ending in 2006.

The reservoir is part of Elkhead State Park.

References

Reservoirs in Colorado